This is a list of lists of people from Kansas.  Inclusion in this list should be reserved for existing Wikipedia lists about people from the American state of Kansas.

List of people from Kansas
The primary list contains notable people who were either born, raised, or have lived for a significant period of time in Kansas.  The list is divided into many categories and sub-categories.
 List of people from Kansas

Geography

Lists of people by county
The state of Kansas has 105 counties.  The following counties have list articles for people from that county:
 List of people from Atchison County, Kansas
 List of people from Butler County, Kansas
 List of people from Clay County, Kansas
 List of people from Cloud County, Kansas
 List of people from Cowley County, Kansas
 List of people from Dickinson County, Kansas
 List of people from Ellis County, Kansas
 List of people from Franklin County, Kansas
 List of people from Harvey County, Kansas
 List of people from Johnson County, Kansas
 List of people from Leavenworth County, Kansas
 List of people from Lyon County, Kansas
 List of people from McPherson County, Kansas
 List of people from Republic County, Kansas

Lists of people by city
The following cities have list articles for people from that city:
 List of people from Dodge City, Kansas
 List of people from Emporia, Kansas
 List of people from Garden City, Kansas
 List of people from Great Bend, Kansas
 List of people from Hays, Kansas
 List of people from Hutchinson, Kansas
 List of people from Junction City, Kansas
 List of people from Kansas City, Kansas

 List of people from Lawrence, Kansas
 List of people from Leavenworth, Kansas
 List of people from Leawood, Kansas
 List of people from Manhattan, Kansas
 List of people from Olathe, Kansas
 List of people from Overland Park, Kansas
 List of people from Pittsburg, Kansas
 List of people from Prairie Village, Kansas
 List of people from Salina, Kansas
 List of people from Shawnee, Kansas
 List of people from Topeka, Kansas
 List of people from Wichita, Kansas

Focus areas

Academics
 Commandant of the United States Army Command and General Staff College 
 List of Emporia State University people
 List of Kansas State University people
 List of University of Kansas people
 List of Washburn University alumni
 List of Wichita State University people

Athletics
Note:  athletic lists are sorted by current conference affiliation, or last affiliation if program is defunct.

Big 12 Conference
 List of Kansas Jayhawks head football coaches
 List of Kansas Jayhawks in the NFL Draft
 List of Kansas State Wildcats head football coaches
 List of Kansas State Wildcats in the NFL Draft

Heart of America Athletic Conference
 List of Baker Wildcats head football coaches
 List of Benedictine Ravens head football coaches
 List of MidAmerica Nazarene Pioneers head football coaches

Kansas Collegiate Athletic Conference
 List of Bethany Terrible Swedes head football coaches
 List of Bethel Threshers head football coaches
 List of Kansas Collegiate Athletic Conference people
 List of Kansas Wesleyan Coyotes head football coaches
 List of McPherson Bulldogs head football coaches
 List of Ottawa Braves head football coaches
 List of Saint Mary Spires head football coaches
 List of Southwestern Moundbuilders head football coaches
 List of Sterling Warriors head football coaches

Mid-America Intercollegiate Athletics Association
 List of Emporia State Hornets head football coaches
 List of Emporia State Hornets in the NFL Draft
 List of Fort Hays State Tigers head football coaches
 List of Pittsburg State Gorillas head football coaches
 List of Washburn Ichabods head football coaches

Midlands Collegiate Athletic Conference
 List of Haskell Indian Nations Fighting Indians head football coaches

Missouri Valley Conference
 List of Wichita State Shockers head football coaches

Crime
 List of people executed in Kansas
 List of inmates of United States Penitentiary, Leavenworth

Military
 Commandant of the United States Army Command and General Staff College

Politicians
 List of governors of Kansas
 List of justices of the Kansas Supreme Court
 List of mayors of Kansas City, Kansas
 List of mayors of Topeka, Kansas
 List of mayors of Wichita, Kansas
 List of United States senators from Kansas
 List of United States representatives from Kansas
 United States congressional delegations from Kansas

See also

 Index of Kansas-related articles

References